Zionism as settler colonialism is the paradigm that views Zionism and the Israeli–Palestinian conflict as a form of settler colonialism. Patrick Wolfe, one of the most influential theorists of settler colonial studies, considered Israel an example and discussed it in his widely cited essay "Settler colonialism and the elimination of the native". Other scholars who have used a settler-colonial analysis of Israel/Palestine include Edward Said, Fayez Sayegh, Maxime Rodinson, George Jabbour, Ibrahim Abu-Lughod, Baha Abu-Laban, Jamil Hilal, and Rosemary Sayigh.

The settler colonialism paradigm as applied to the Israel–Palestine case has been increasingly developing and consolidating in the twenty-first century. The current conceptual framework reemerged in response to shifts in the political landscape in the mid-1990s that "reframed the history of the Nakba as enduring" in a process led by Palestinian scholars in Israel. The use of this paradigm has increased in recent years among activists, and "to a lesser extent" within academic circles.

The characterization of Zionism as a settler colonial movement is interpreted by the Israeli state as either an attack on its legitimacy or a form of antisemitism, often in its public diplomacy efforts.

Background

In contrast to classical colonialism, in settler colonialism the focus is on eliminating, rather than exploiting, the original inhabitants of a territory. Commonly cited cases of settler colonialism include the United States, Canada, Australia, and New Zealand. As theorized by Patrick Wolfe, settler colonialism is a structure, not an event. Settler colonialism operates by processes including physical elimination of the native but also can encompass projects of assimilation, segregation, miscegenation, religious conversion, and incarceration.

In 1967, the French historian Maxime Rodinson wrote an article later translated and published in English as Israel: A Colonial Settler-State? Lorenzo Veracini describes Israel as a colonial state and writes that Jewish settlers could expel the British in 1948 only because they had their own colonial relationships inside and outside Israel's new borders. Veracini believes the possibility of an Israeli disengagement is always latent and this relationship could be severed, through an "accommodation of a Palestinian Israeli autonomy within the institutions of the Israeli state". Other commentators, such as Daiva Stasiulis, Nira Yuval-Davis, and Joseph Massad in the "Post Colonial Colony: time, space and bodies in Palestine/ Israel in the persistence of the Palestinian Question" have included Israel in their global analysis of settler societies. Ilan Pappé describes Zionism and Israel in similar terms. Scholar Amal Jamal, from Tel Aviv University, has stated, "Israel was created by a settler-colonial movement of Jewish immigrants".

Manifestations
In 1905, jobless Jewish settlers promoted the idea of Hebrew labor arguing that all Jewish-owned businesses should only employ Jews, to displace Arab workforce hired by the First Aliyah. Zionist organizations acquired land under the restriction that it could never pass into non-Jewish ownership. Later on the kibbutzim—collectivist, all-Jewish agricultural settlements—were developed to counter plantation economies relying on Jewish owners and Palestinian farmers. The kibbutz was also the prototype of Jewish-only settlements later established beyond Israel's pre-1967 borders. In 1948, 750,000 Palestinians were forcibly displaced from the area that became Israel and 500 Palestinian villages, as well as Palestinian-inhabited urban areas, were destroyed. Although considered by some Israelis to be a "brutal twist of fate, unexpected, undesired, unconsidered by the early [Zionist] pioneers", some historians have described the Nakba as a campaign of ethnic cleansing.

In the aftermath of the Nakba, Palestinian land was expropriated on a large scale and Palestinian citizens of Israel were encircled in specific areas. Arnon Degani argues that ending military rule over Israel's Palestinian citizens in 1966 shifted from colonial to settler-colonial governance. After the Israeli capture of the Golan Heights in 1967, there was a nearly complete ethnic cleansing of the area, leaving only 6,404 Syrians out of about 128,000 who had lived there before the war. They had been forced out by campaigns of intimidation and forced removal, and those who tried to return were deported. After the Israeli capture of the West Bank, about 250,000 of 850,000 inhabitants fled or were expelled. According to Israeli academics Neve Gordon and Moriel Ram, the incompleteness versus completeness of ethnic cleansing has affected the different forms that Israeli settler colonialism has taken in the West Bank versus the Golan Heights. For example, the few remaining Syrian Druze were offered Israeli citizenship in order to further the annexation of the area, while there was never an intention to incorporate West Bank Palestinians into the Israeli demos. Another example is the dual legal structure in the West Bank compared to the unitary Israeli law imposed in the Golan Heights.

According to Patrick Wolfe, Israel's settler colonialism manifests in immigration policies that promote unlimited immigration of Jews while denying family reunification for Palestinian citizens. Wolfe adds, "Despite Zionism's chronic addiction to territorial expansion, Israel's borders do not preclude the option of removal [of Palestinians] (in this connection, it is hardly surprising that a nation that has driven so many of its original inhabitants into the sand should express an abiding fear of itself being driven into the sea)."

Salamanca et al. state that Israeli practices have often been studied as distinct but related phenomena, and that the settler-colonial paradigm is an opportunity to understand them together. As examples of settler colonial phenomena they include "aerial and maritime bombardment, massacre and invasion, home demolitions, land theft, identity card confiscation, racist laws and loyalty tests, the wall, the siege on Gaza, cultural appropriation, dependence on willing (or unwilling) native collaboration regarding security arrangements".

Scholars of settler colonialism viewed Zionism's external supporters, either private organizations or various states (such as the United Kingdom, France, or the United States), as a metropole. A settler-colonial analysis has been used to explain the positive relationship between Israel and other settler-colonial states such as the United States and Australia. According to Martin Braach-Maksvytis, Germany invested in Israel after losing its colonies and that this relationship later became a kind of "redemptive proxy colonialism".

Historiography
According to the Israeli sociologist Uri Ram, the characterization of Zionism as colonial "is probably as old as the Zionist movement". John Collins states that multiple scholars have established that "the architects of Zionism were conscious and often unapologetic about their status as colonizers whose right to the land superseded that of Palestine’s Arab inhabitants". Other settler colonial projects did not lay out their plans for dispossessing and eliminating the inhabitants in detail and in advance. One early analysis was that of Palestinian writer Fayez Sayegh in his 1965 essay "Zionist Colonialism in Palestine", which was unusual for the pre-1967 era in specifying Zionism as a form of settler colonialism. Sayegh later drafted the UN's "Zionism is racism" resolution. After Israel assumed control of the whole Mandatory Palestine in 1967, settler-colonial analyses became prominent among Palestinians. In Israel, the New Historians, a movement that emerged in the 1980s, was associated with colonial analysis. Along with explicitly settler colonial analysis, another persistent view is that the "Zionist national project has been predicated on the destruction of the Palestinian one".

Although settler colonialism is an empirical framework, it is associated with favoring a one-state solution. Rachel Busbridge argues that settler colonialism is "a coherent and legible frame" and "a far more accurate portrayal of the conflict than the picture of Palestinian criminality and Israeli victimhood that has conventionally been painted". She also argues that settler colonial analysis is limited, especially when it comes to the question of decolonization.

Anthropologist Anne de Jong says that early Zionists promoted a narrative of binary conflict between two competing groups with equally valid claims in order to deflect criticisms of settler colonialism. In 2013, historian Lorenzo Veracini argued that settler colonialism has been successful in Israel proper but unsuccessful in the territories occupied in 1967. Historian Rashid Khalidi argues that all other settler-colonial wars in the twentieth century ended in defeat for colonists, making Palestine an exception: "Israel has been extremely successful in forcibly establishing itself as a colonial reality in a post-colonial age".

Elia Zureik's Israel’s Colonial Project in Palestine: Brutal Pursuit, updates his earlier work on colonialism and Palestine and applies Michel Foucault’s work on biopolitics to colonialism, arguing that racism plays a central role and that surveillance becomes a tool of governance. It also analyses the dispossession of indigenous people and population transfer, including sociological, historical and postcolonial studies into an examination of the Zionist project in Palestine. Sánchez and Pita argue that Israeli settler colonialism has had far more severe effects on the indigenous Palestinian population than the discriminations suffered by the Spanish and Mexican populations in the Southwest of the United States in the wake of the Treaty of Guadalupe Hidalgo which ended the Mexican–American War.  Most scholars who have addressed Israeli settler colonialism have not discussed the Golan Heights.

Reception
The portrayal of Zionism as a colonial movement is rejected by most Israeli Jews and perceived either as an attack on the legitimacy of Israel or a form of antisemitism. Some critics highlight ideas such as the putative non-exploitation of indigenous labor by Zionists or the lack of a metropole as reasons not to consider it a colonial movement.

Historian S. Ilan Troen, in 'De-Judaizing the Homeland: Academic Politics in Rewriting the History of Palestine', argues that Zionism was the repatriation of a long displaced indigenous population to their historic homeland, and that Zionism does not fit the framework of a settler society as it "was not part of the process of imperial expansion in search of power and markets." Troen further argues that there are several differences between European colonialism and the Zionist movement, including that "there is no New Vilna, New Bialystock, New Warsaw, New England, New York,...and so on" in Israel.

Sociologist Areej Sabbagh-Khoury suggests that "in tracing the settler colonial paradigm ... Israeli critical sociology, albeit groundbreaking, has suffered from a myopia engendered through hegemony." She notes that "until recently, most Israeli academics engaged in discussing the nature of the state ignored its settler colonial components", and that scholarship conducted "within a settler colonial framework" has not been given serious attention in Israeli critical academia, "perhaps due to the general disavowal of the colonial framework among Israeli scholars."

References

Notes

Citations

Sources

Further reading

Anti-Zionism
Historiography of Israel
Settler colonialism